The snowy-browed flycatcher (Ficedula hyperythra) is a species of bird in the family Muscicapidae.

It is found in Bangladesh, Bhutan, Cambodia, China, India, Indonesia, Laos, Malaysia, Myanmar, Nepal, Philippines, Taiwan, Thailand and Vietnam. Its natural habitats are subtropical or tropical moist lowland forest and subtropical or tropical moist montane forest.

References

snowy-browed flycatcher
Birds of North India
Birds of Nepal
Birds of Eastern Himalaya
Birds of Yunnan
Birds of Southeast Asia
snowy-browed flycatcher
snowy-browed flycatcher
Taxonomy articles created by Polbot